This is a selected list of massively multiplayer online real-time strategy games. MMORTSs are large multi-user games that take place in perpetual online worlds with hundreds or thousands of other players.

Business models

MMORTSs today use a wide range of business models, from completely free of charge (no strings attached) or advertise funded to various kinds of payment plans. This list uses the following terms.
Free-to-play (F2P) means that there might be a cost to purchase the software but there is no subscription charge or added payments needed to access game content.
Pay-to-play means that players must pay, usually by monthly subscription, in order to play the game.
Freemium means that the majority of game content is available for free but players can pay for extra content or added perks.
Absolutely Free means that the game is completely free to play with no option to pay for any extra content or services whatsoever.

List of notable MMORTSs

See also
List of massively multiplayer online games
List of free massively multiplayer online games
List of free multiplayer online games
List of multiplayer browser games
Online game
Strategy video game
Real-time strategy

Notes

References 

MMORTSs
list